In mathematics, the signature operator is an elliptic differential operator defined on a certain subspace of the space of differential forms on an even-dimensional compact Riemannian manifold, whose analytic index is the same as the topological signature of the manifold if the dimension of the manifold is a multiple of four. It is an instance of a Dirac-type operator.

Definition in the even-dimensional case

Let  be a compact Riemannian manifold of even dimension . Let 

 

The Riemannian metric on  allows us to define the Hodge star operator  and with it the inner product

 

on forms. Denote by

the adjoint operator of the exterior differential . This operator can be expressed purely in terms of the Hodge star operator as follows: 

Now consider  acting on the space of all forms .
One way to consider this as a graded operator is the following: Let  be an involution on the space of all forms defined by:

Consequently, 

Definition in the odd-dimensional case

In the odd-dimensional case one defines the signature operator to be  acting 

Hirzebruch Signature Theorem

where the right hand side is the topological signature (i.e. the signature of a quadratic form on  defined by the cup product).

The Heat Equation approach to the Atiyah-Singer index theorem can then be used to show that:

Homotopy invariance of the higher indices

Kaminker and Miller proved that the higher indices of the signature operator are homotopy-invariant.

See also
Hirzebruch signature theorem
Pontryagin class
Friedrich Hirzebruch
Michael Atiyah
Isadore Singer

Notes

References

Elliptic partial differential equations